Ki Hui-hyeon (born June 16, 1995), known mononymously as Huihyeon and formerly known as Cathy, is a South Korean rapper, singer-songwriter and actress. She was best known as a member of the girl group DIA. In September 2022, Huihyeon transitioned into acting with joined Hicon Entertainment.

Early life
Ki was born on June 16, 1995, in Namwon, North Jeolla, South Korea.

Career

Pre-debut
Ki is a former Woollim Entertainment trainee and trained with members of the girl group Lovelyz.

2015–present: Debut and Produce 101

In February 2015, MBK Entertainment announced its plans to debut a new girl group under survival program through which the public could become familiar with the group members. In June 2015, MBK announced that they had canceled their plans for a survival program, and decided to select the members internally. MBK Entertainment revealed the final line-up and the group name.

Ki debuted under stage name Cathy as the main rapper of DIA. The group made their official debut stage on the music program Mnet's M Countdown on September 17, 2015. Shortly after debut with the group in December 2015, MBK Entertainment announced she had temporarily withdrawn from the group, along with her bandmate Jung Chae-yeon, to represent MBK Entertainment on reality girl group survival show Produce 101 for the chance to debut in a Mnet girl group. She auditioned and signed contracts with the show before DIA's official debut. Ki finished in 19th place. On May 11, 2016, MBK Entertainment confirmed that she and Jung Chae-yeon had re-joined DIA. She has changed her stage name from Cathy to her real name (Huihyeon) since rejoining the group. On August 17, it was announced that Ki would be collaborating with I.O.I members Choi Yoo-jung and Jeon So-mi for the digital single, "Flower, Wind and You", which was produced by Boi B. She is the current leader of the group, starting from the promotions of the mini album Spell.

In 2016, she also appeared on Mnet's rap survival program Unpretty Rapstar 3 as a contestant.

In September 2019, Ki participated in the survival program show, V-1, to select the Vocal Queen among the various girl group members, where only the top 12 girl group members in votes would progress and perform on the show. However, she was not selected among the final members to perform on stage. She was also cast in a drama 패셔니스타, aired on Ssulrandi and YouTube.

In September 2022, Ki signed a contract with Hicon Entertainment which started as an actress.

Discography

Singles

Other songs

Filmography

Television series

Television shows

References

External links 

Living people
People from Namwon
MBK Entertainment artists
South Korean female idols
South Korean women pop singers
South Korean women rappers
Unpretty Rapstar contestants
Produce 101 contestants
1995 births
Haengju Ki clan
21st-century South Korean women singers
21st-century South Korean singers